Sumihiro (written: 澄博 or 純熈) is a masculine Japanese given name. Notable people with the name include:

, Japanese daimyō
, Japanese alpine skier

See also
Sumihiro's theorem, a theorem in algebraic geometry

Japanese masculine given names